Meri (also Romanized as Merī) is a village in Talarpey Rural District, in the Central District of Simorgh County, Mazandaran Province, Iran. At the 2006 census, its population was 675, in 176 families.

References 

Populated places in Simorgh County